Live at the Final Frontier is the debut live album by German heavy metal band Iron Savior, released on 29 May 2015 via AFM Records. It was recorded live in Hamburg, Germany on 10 January 2015 during their tour of Rise of the Hero. It contains two CDs and a DVD featuring the band's performance plus bonus video material and additional backstage and concert footage.

CD track Listing

DVD track Listing

Credits
Iron Savior
Piet Sielck – vocals, guitars
Joachim "Piesel" Küstner – guitars
Jan-Sören Eckert – bass, additional vocals
Thomas Nack – drums

Additional personnel
Felipe Machado Franco – cover art

References

Iron Savior albums
2015 live albums
AFM Records live albums